FC Ocean Kerch is a Ukrainian football team based in Kerch. After the Russian annexation of Crimea was admitted to the Crimean Premier League as a Russian team.

Team names

First club (1955–69):
1955–1964: FC Metalurh Kerch
1964–1969: FC Avanhard Kerch
Second club (1976–97):
1976–1997: FC Okean Kerch
Third club (2010–present):
2010–present: FC Okean Kerch

History

Metallurg
The city association football team in Kerch existed as early as 1938 under a name of Stal. It is not known what happened with the original team.

The current club was established in 1955 as Metallurg (Metalurh) soon after the Crimean peninsula was transferred to Ukraine within the Soviet Union, but it was not until 1962 when it represented the city at professional level, competing in the Ukrainian championship of the Soviet Second League. In 1970, the club dissolved again.

Okean
In 1976 it was revived competing all the way pass the dissolution of the Soviet Union. In 1993 it carried a name of Voikovets, in 1994 – Metalurh. In 1995–96 Ukrainian Cup both Metalurh and Okean participated in the tournament. In 1997, the club lost its professional license and disappeared for quite some time.

In 2010, it was reestablished anew. Following the Russian annexation of Crimea, the Football Federation of Ukraine lodged a complaint with UEFA about Crimean clubs' participation in Russian competitions. On 22 August 2014, UEFA decided "that any football matches played by Crimean clubs organised under the auspices of the Russian Football Union will not be recognised by UEFA until further notice".

On 4 December 2014, UEFA banned Crimean clubs from participating in Russian professional competitions, and announced that a new local Crimean Premier League would be set up in the future that UEFA will manage directly. Ocean Kerch was one of the 8 original clubs that formed the Crimean Premier League for the 2015–16 season.

Ahead of the 2022/2023 season the club has announced its intention to compete in the Russian Football National League 2.

Honours
 Ukrainian Football Amateur Association (4th Tier)
  1995–96 (Gr. 6 as Portovyk)
  1978
Crimea championship (Lower League Tier)
  1949, 1950, 1954, 1956, 1960, 1962, 1995/96 (7×)

Notable people
 Anatoliy Kroshchenko, a manager in 1979

Current squad 
, according to the official site

Coaches (since annexation)
 2014–2016: Artur Olenin
 2015–2017: Serhiy Yesin
 2017–present: Oleh Leshchynskyi

League and cup history

Soviet Union
Sources: 
{|class="wikitable"
|-bgcolor="#efefef"
! Season
! Div.
! Pos.
! Pl.
! W
! D
! L
! GS
! GA
! P
!Domestic Cup
!colspan=2|Europe
!Notes
|-
|align=center colspan=14|Metalurh Kerch
|- bgcolor=SteelBlue
|align=center|1962
|align=center|5th Crimean Championship
|align=center colspan=8|...
|align=center|
|align=center|
|align=center|
|align=center bgcolor=lightgreen|won play-off againstSKCF Sevastopol
|- bgcolor=PowderBlue
|align=center rowspan=2|1963
|align=center rowspan=2|3rd Class B, Ukrainian SSR
|align=center|19/20
|align=center|38
|align=center|6
|align=center|9
|align=center|23
|align=center|28
|align=center|57
|align=center|21
|align=center rowspan=2|Zone 2 Ukrainian SSR,  finals
|align=center rowspan=2|
|align=center rowspan=2|
|align=center|Zone 2; for play-offagainst other 19th place
|- bgcolor=PowderBlue
|align=center|38
|align=center|2
|align=center|0
|align=center|1
|align=center|1
|align=center|0
|align=center|1
|align=center|1
|align=center|for Places 37–38lost to Naftovyk Drohobych
|- bgcolor=PowderBlue
|align=center rowspan=2|1964
|align=center rowspan=2|3rd Class B, Ukrainian SSR
|align=center|12/16
|align=center|30
|align=center|7
|align=center|13
|align=center|10
|align=center|14
|align=center|19
|align=center|27
|align=center rowspan=2|Zone 3 Ukrainian SSR,  finals
|align=center rowspan=2|
|align=center rowspan=2|
|align=center|Zone 3
|- bgcolor=PowderBlue
|align=center bgcolor=tan|3/6
|align=center|10
|align=center|3
|align=center|4
|align=center|3
|align=center|6
|align=center|8
|align=center|10
|align=center|for Places 31–36
|-
|align=center colspan=14|Avanhard Kerch
|-  bgcolor=PowderBlue
|align=center rowspan=2|1965
|align=center rowspan=2|3rd Class B, Ukrainian SSR
|align=center|14/16
|align=center|30
|align=center|8
|align=center|6
|align=center|16
|align=center|30
|align=center|47
|align=center|22
|align=center rowspan=2|Zone 1 Ukrainian SSR,  finals
|align=center rowspan=2|
|align=center rowspan=2|
|align=center|Zone 1
|- bgcolor=PowderBlue
|align=center|6/6
|align=center|10
|align=center|1
|align=center|5
|align=center|4
|align=center|12
|align=center|19
|align=center|7
|align=center|for Places 31–36
|- bgcolor=PowderBlue
|align=center rowspan=2|1966
|align=center rowspan=2|3rd Class B, Ukrainian SSR
|align=center|11/20
|align=center|38
|align=center|13
|align=center|11
|align=center|14
|align=center|41
|align=center|42
|align=center|37
|align=center rowspan=2|
|align=center rowspan=2|
|align=center rowspan=2|
|align=center|Zone 2; for play-offagainst other 11th place
|- bgcolor=PowderBlue
|align=center|22
|align=center colspan=7|refused to play against Avanhard Rivne
|align=center|for Places 21–22
|- bgcolor=PowderBlue
|align=center|1967
|align=center|3rd Class B, Ukrainian SSR
|align=center|20/21
|align=center|40
|align=center|5
|align=center|12
|align=center|23
|align=center|22
|align=center|52
|align=center|22
|align=center|Zone 2 Ukrainian SSR,  finals
|align=center|
|align=center|
|align=center|Zone 2
|- bgcolor=PowderBlue
|align=center|1968
|align=center|3rd Class B, Ukrainian SSR
|align=center|17/21
|align=center|40
|align=center|9
|align=center|14
|align=center|17
|align=center|32
|align=center|46
|align=center|32
|align=center|Zone Crimea,  finals
|align=center|
|align=center|
|align=center|Zone 2
|- bgcolor=PowderBlue
|align=center|1969
|align=center|3rd Class B, Ukrainian SSR
|align=center|21/21
|align=center|40
|align=center|9
|align=center|10
|align=center|21
|align=center|22
|align=center|45
|align=center|28
|align=center|
|align=center|
|align=center|
|align=center bgcolor=lightgrey|Zone 2Withdrew
|-
|align=center colspan=14|in 1970–1976 club's history is unknown
|-
|align=center colspan=14|Okean Kerch
|-  bgcolor=SteelBlue
|align=center|1977
|align=center|4th KFK Ukrainian SSR Gr. 5
|align=center bgcolor=tan|3/12
|align=center|22
|align=center|13
|align=center|2
|align=center|7
|align=center|36
|align=center|20
|align=center|28
|align=center|
|align=center|
|align=center|
|align=center|
|-  bgcolor=SteelBlue
|align=center rowspan=2|1978
|align=center rowspan=2|4th KFK Ukrainian SSR Gr. 5
|align=center bgcolor=gold|1/10
|align=center|18
|align=center|14
|align=center|2
|align=center|2
|align=center|32
|align=center|12
|align=center|30
|align=center rowspan=2|
|align=center rowspan=2|
|align=center rowspan=2|
|align=center|to final stage
|-   bgcolor=SteelBlue
|align=center bgcolor=tan|3/6
|align=center|5
|align=center|2
|align=center|0
|align=center|3
|align=center|4
|align=center|4
|align=center|4
|align=center bgcolor=lightgreen|Promoted
|-  bgcolor=PowderBlue
|align=center|1979
|align=center|3rd Second League Gr. 2
|align=center|18/24
|align=center|46
|align=center|12
|align=center|14
|align=center|20
|align=center|36
|align=center|52
|align=center|38
|align=center|
|align=center|
|align=center|
|align=center|
|-  bgcolor=PowderBlue
|align=center|1980
|align=center|3rd Second League Gr. 5
|align=center|14/23
|align=center|44
|align=center|13
|align=center|12
|align=center|19
|align=center|40
|align=center|49
|align=center|38
|align=center|
|align=center|
|align=center|
|align=center|
|-  bgcolor=PowderBlue
|align=center|1981
|align=center|3rd Second League Gr. 5
|align=center|13/23
|align=center|44
|align=center|13
|align=center|14
|align=center|17
|align=center|45
|align=center|51
|align=center|40
|align=center|
|align=center|
|align=center|
|align=center|
|-  bgcolor=PowderBlue
|align=center|1982
|align=center|3rd Second League Gr. 6
|align=center|23/24
|align=center|46
|align=center|12
|align=center|11
|align=center|23
|align=center|43
|align=center|67
|align=center|35
|align=center|
|align=center|
|align=center|
|align=center|
|-  bgcolor=PowderBlue
|align=center|1983
|align=center|3rd Second League Gr. 6
|align=center|19/26
|align=center|50
|align=center|13
|align=center|16
|align=center|21
|align=center|44
|align=center|58
|align=center|42
|align=center|
|align=center|
|align=center|
|align=center|
|-  bgcolor=PowderBlue
|align=center|1984
|align=center|3rd Second League Gr. 6
|align=center|25/26
|align=center|38
|align=center|9
|align=center|10
|align=center|19
|align=center|38
|align=center|65
|align=center|28
|align=center|
|align=center|
|align=center|
|align=center|two stages
|-  bgcolor=PowderBlue
|align=center|1985
|align=center|3rd Second League Gr. 6
|align=center|14/28
|align=center|40
|align=center|12
|align=center|8
|align=center|20
|align=center|42
|align=center|62
|align=center|32
|align=center|
|align=center|
|align=center|
|align=center|two stages
|-  bgcolor=PowderBlue
|align=center|1986
|align=center|3rd Second League Gr. 6
|align=center|14/28
|align=center|40
|align=center|14
|align=center|4
|align=center|22
|align=center|46
|align=center|63
|align=center|32
|align=center|
|align=center|
|align=center|
|align=center|two stages
|-  bgcolor=PowderBlue
|align=center|1988
|align=center|3rd Second League Gr. 5
|align=center|4/26
|align=center|50
|align=center|24
|align=center|11
|align=center|15
|align=center|71
|align=center|60
|align=center|59
|align=center|
|align=center|
|align=center|
|align=center|
|-  bgcolor=PowderBlue
|align=center|1989
|align=center|3rd Second League Gr. 6
|align=center|24/27
|align=center|52
|align=center|15
|align=center|9
|align=center|28
|align=center|50
|align=center|70
|align=center|39
|align=center| finals
|align=center|
|align=center|
|align=center bgcolor=pink|Relegated to newly formed division
|-  bgcolor=SteelBlue
|align=center|1990
|align=center|4th Lower Second League Gr. 1
|align=center|17/19
|align=center|36
|align=center|7
|align=center|9
|align=center|20
|align=center|31
|align=center|55
|align=center|23
|align=center| finals
|align=center|
|align=center|
|align=center|
|-  bgcolor=SteelBlue
|align=center|1991
|align=center|4th Lower Second League Gr. 1
|align=center|24/26
|align=center|50
|align=center|15
|align=center|10
|align=center|25
|align=center|49
|align=center|72
|align=center|40
|align=center|
|align=center|
|align=center|
|align=center bgcolor=brick|Reorganization of competitions
|-
|}

Ukraine
Sources: 
{|class="wikitable"
|-bgcolor="#efefef"
! Season
! Div.
! Pos.
! Pl.
! W
! D
! L
! GS
! GA
! P
!Domestic Cup
!colspan=2|Europe
!Notes
|- align=center bgcolor=PowderBlue
|align=center|1992
|align=center|3rd Transitional League Gr. 2
|align=center|6/9
|align=center|16
|align=center|6
|align=center|5
|align=center|5
|align=center|16
|align=center|10
|align=center|17
|align=center|
|align=center|
|align=center|
|align=center bgcolor=brick|Reorganization of competitions
|- align=center bgcolor=SteelBlue
|align=center|1992–93
|align=center|4th Transitional League
|align=center|5/18
|align=center|34
|align=center|17
|align=center|8
|align=center|9
|align=center|47
|align=center|32
|align=center|42
|align=center|
|align=center|
|align=center|
|align=center bgcolor=lightgreen|Promoted
|-  bgcolor=PowderBlue
|align=center|1993–94
|align=center|3rd Second League
|align=center|19/22
|align=center|42
|align=center|12
|align=center|11
|align=center|19
|align=center|50
|align=center|69
|align=center|35
|align=center| finals
|align=center|
|align=center|
|align=center|name change
|-  bgcolor=PowderBlue
|align=center|1994–95
|align=center|3rd Second League
|align=center|19/22
|align=center|42
|align=center|11
|align=center|5
|align=center|26
|align=center|42
|align=center|67
|align=center|38
|align=center| finals
|align=center|
|align=center|
|align=center bgcolor=pink|Relegated
|- align=center bgcolor=SteelBlue
|align=center|1995–96
|align=center|4th Amateur League Gr. 6
|align=center bgcolor=gold|1/4
|align=center|6
|align=center|5
|align=center|0
|align=center|1
|align=center|6
|align=center|3
|align=center|15
|align=center| finals
|align=center|
|align=center|
|align=center bgcolor=lightgreen|Promoted
|- align=center bgcolor=PowderBlue
|align=center|1996–97
|align=center|3rd Second League Gr. B
|align=center|17/17
|align=center|32
|align=center|6
|align=center|5
|align=center|21
|align=center|27
|align=center|57
|align=center|23
|align=center| finals
|align=center|
|align=center|
|align=center bgcolor=lightgrey|Withdrew
|- 
|align=center colspan=14|idle in 2000s
|- bgcolor=SteelBlue
|align=center|2012
|align=center|5th Crimean Championship
|align=center|10/12
|align=center|22
|align=center|4
|align=center|4
|align=center|14
|align=center|17
|align=center|64
|align=center|16
|align=center|
|align=center|
|align=center|
|align=center|
|- 
|align=center colspan=14|...
|- bgcolor=SteelBlue
|align=center|2014
|align=center|5th Crimean Championship
|align=center|10/16
|align=center|14
|align=center|7
|align=center|3
|align=center|4
|align=center|26
|align=center|19
|align=center|24
|align=center|
|align=center|
|align=center|
|align=center bgcolor=brick|Reorganization of competitions
|-
|}

Crimea
{|class="wikitable"
|-bgcolor="#efefef"
! Season
! Div.
! Pos.
! Pl.
! W
! D
! L
! GS
! GA
! P
!Domestic Cup
!colspan=2|Europe
!Notes
|-
|align=center|2015
|align=center|1st All-Crimean Championship Gr. A
|align=center bgcolor=silver|2/10
|align=center|9
|align=center|6
|align=center|1
|align=center|2
|align=center|21
|align=center|9
|align=center|19
|align=center|
|align=center|
|align=center|
|align=center bgcolor=brick|Reorganization of competitions
|-
|align=center|2015–16 
|align=center|1st Premier League
|align=center|5/8
|align=center|28
|align=center|9
|align=center|7
|align=center|12
|align=center|31
|align=center|37
|align=center|34
|align=center|Group stage
|align=center|
|align=center|
|align=center|
|-
|align=center|2016–17 
|align=center|1st Premier League
|align=center|4/8
|align=center|28
|align=center|14
|align=center|4
|align=center|10
|align=center|46
|align=center|34
|align=center|46
|align=center| finals
|align=center|
|align=center|
|align=center|
|-
|align=center|2017–18 
|align=center|1st Premier League
|align=center|6/8
|align=center|28
|align=center|5
|align=center|8
|align=center|15
|align=center|32
|align=center|47
|align=center|23
|align=center| finals
|align=center|
|align=center|
|align=center|
|-
|align=center|2018–19 
|align=center|1st Premier League
|align=center|4/8
|align=center|28
|align=center|11
|align=center|4
|align=center|13
|align=center|34
|align=center|48
|align=center|37
|align=center bgcolor=#A67D3D| finals
|align=center|
|align=center|
|align=center|
|-
|align=center|2019–20 
|align=center|1st Premier League
|align=center|6/8
|align=center|28
|align=center|7
|align=center|3
|align=center|18
|align=center|34
|align=center|58
|align=center|24
|align=center| finals
|align=center|
|align=center|
|align=center|
|-
|align=center|2020–21 
|align=center|1st Premier League
|align=center|6/8
|align=center|28
|align=center|11
|align=center|6
|align=center|11
|align=center|40
|align=center|35
|align=center|39
|align=center| finals
|align=center|
|align=center|
|align=center|
|-
|align=center|2021–22 
|align=center|1st Premier League
|align=center|
|align=center|
|align=center|
|align=center|
|align=center|
|align=center|
|align=center|
|align=center|
|align=center|
|align=center|
|align=center|
|align=center|
|-
|}

References

 
Football clubs in Crimea
Association football clubs established in 1955
1955 establishments in Ukraine
Kerch